Elizabeth Smylie and Janine Thompson were the defending champions, but Smylie did not compete this year. Thompson teamed up with Jenny Byrne and lost in the first round to Claudia Kohde-Kilsch and Brenda Schultz.

Helen Kelesi and Monica Seles won the title by defeating Laura Garrone and Laura Golarsa 6–3, 6–4 in the final.

Seeds
The first four seeds received a bye to the second round.

Draw

Finals

Top half

Bottom half

References

External links
 Official results archive (ITF)
 Official results archive (WTA)

Italian Open - Womens Doubles
1990 Italian Open (tennis)